Gabriele Valvassori (21 August 1683 – 7 April 1761) was an Italian architect of the late-Baroque period, mainly active in his native city of Rome.

In 1711–1717, he helped design the small church of  San Giuseppe alle Fornaci near Foligno and as an assistant to Filippo Barigioni, he helped the enlargement of the facilities at the thermal baths of Nocera Umbra .

In Rome, he was patronized by the Pamphilj family, helping design the main altar (1720) in the church of Sant'Agnese in Agone, which stands adjacent to the original family palace in Rome. In the 1730s, he helped in the designs of the Palazzo Doria-Pamphili. The complex we see today had expanded laterally from the palace at the site once owned by the Della Rovere and Aldobrandini families. Initial designs by Carlo Maderno, were amplified by Antonio del Grande and added to by Carlo Fontana (including chapel) and Francesco Nicoletti. Valvassori is responsible for the massive façade on the Via del Corso.

For the Archiconfraternity of Padri Bergamaschi, from 1729 to 1735, he helped develop their property on Piazza Colonna, which included the Cerasoli College. He aided in the restoration and remodeling of the Dominican church of Santi Quirico e Giulitta, in Rome. He designed the façade of Santa Maria dell'Orto.

In 1737, he became a member of the Accademia di San Luca and professor in 1758.  He became a regent of the Congregazione dei Virtuosi al Pantheon.

Works
Church of San Giuseppe alle Fornaci, Foligno (1715–1718)
Main Altar of Sant'Agnese in Agone, Rome (1720)
Minor contributions to Villa Aldobrandini, Frascati (1723–1729)
Cerasoli College,(still part of the Pontifical Roman Seminary, Rome (1729–1735)
Palazzo Doria-Pamphili, Rome (1730–1735, façade, courtyard, gardens, and hall of mirrors)
Santa Maria della Luce (Roma), Rome (1730, restoration)
Santa Maria dell'Orto, Rome (1750, Chapel of St. John the Baptist)
Church of Santi Quirico e Giulitta, Rome (1750–1753, restoration, sacristy)

References

1683 births
1781 deaths
18th-century Italian architects
Architects from Rome
Italian Baroque architects